Gymnopilus viscidissimus is a species of mushroom in the family Hymenogastraceae.

See also

List of Gymnopilus species

External links
Gymnopilus viscidissimus at Index Fungorum

viscidissimus
Taxa named by William Alphonso Murrill